Laura Tonke (born 14 April 1974 in Berlin) is a German actress.

Selected filmography

References

External links
 

1974 births
Living people
German film actresses
Actresses from Berlin